Jeanne Peiffer (born 20 August 1948 in Mersch) is a Luxembourg historian of mathematics.

Contributions
She deals with scientific journals in the 17th and 18th centuries, also from a scientific sociological point of view and with the aspect of the history of the specialization of mathematics journals, with perspective in the Renaissance in connection with geometry and optics, and the letter as a communication tool of mathematics in the 18th century.

She was co-editor (with ) of the correspondence of Johann Bernoulli (Birkhäuser 1988, 1992) and published a French translation of the geometry of Albrecht Dürer. With Amy Dahan, she wrote a popular French-language textbook of mathematics, translated into English and German.

Education and career
Peiffer studied at the University of Luxembourg where she is a professor after being a student of René Taton. She is Emeritus Research Director at the CNRS and the Center Alexandre Koyré of the CNRS and the École des hautes études en sciences sociales (EHESS).

Publications 
with Amy Dahan-Dalmédico:  Une histoire des mathématiques, Routes et Dédales, éditions Études vivantes Québec, 1982, Éditions du Seuil, Paris, 1986, 4th edition 2001
German translation: Wege und Irrwege – eine Geschichte der Mathematik, Birkhäuser 1994, Springer 2014
Herausgeberin und Übersetzerin: Albrecht Dürer, Géométrie, Ed. du Seuil 1995 (also translated into Spanish)
Faire des mathématiques par lettres, Revue d'histoire des mathématiques IV/1, 1998, pp. 143–157
with Jean-Pierre Vittu: Les journaux savants, formes de la communication et agents de la construction des savoirs (xviie – xviiie siècles), Dix-huitième siècle, volume 40, 2008, pp. 281–300.
Constructing perspective in sixteenth-century Nuremberg, in: Mario Carpo, Frédérique Lemerle (publisher), Perspective, Projections & Design. Technologies of Architectural Representation, London & New York : Routledge, 2007, pp. 65–76

References

External links 
 Jeanne Peiffer on Centre Alexandre-Koyré
 Jeanne Peiffer on Babelio
 Publications by Jeanne Peiffer on CAIRN
 Jeanne Peiffer at l'Harmattan
 Notice in English

1948 births
Living people
Historians of mathematics
Academic staff of the University of Luxembourg
20th-century Luxembourgian historians
21st-century Luxembourgian historians
Women historians
21st-century Luxembourgian women writers
20th-century Luxembourgian women writers
Research directors of the French National Centre for Scientific Research